The Talaud kingfisher (Todiramphus enigma) is a species of bird in the family Alcedinidae.

It is endemic to the Talaud Islands north of Sulawesi in Indonesia.

Its natural habitats are subtropical or tropical moist lowland forests and rivers.
It is threatened by habitat loss.

References

Endemic birds of Sulawesi
Todiramphus
Birds described in 1904
Taxonomy articles created by Polbot